The Mid-American Conference men's soccer tournament was the conference championship tournament in soccer for the Mid-American Conference.  The tournament was held every year from 1994 until 2019. It was a single-elimination tournament and seeding was based on regular season records. The winner, declared conference champion, received the conference's automatic bid to the NCAA Division I men's soccer championship.

Starting in 2020, the tournament was canceled, and the regular-season champion was declared the conference champion, which was intended to remain in effect until at least 2024. This was in part due to the COVID-19 pandemic.  However, in 2021 the Conference resumed hosting the tournament.

The MAC discontinued sponsorship of men's soccer at the end of the 2022 season. Conference realignment in the 2020s had decimated MAC men's soccer, leaving it with only five members (four full members plus one single-sport affiliate) in 2022. With no prospect of adding the sixth member needed to preserve the conference's automatic bid to the NCAA tournament, the MAC shut down its league. In the final season, the tournament, which had featured four teams for its most recent editions, was reduced to a championship game featuring the top two teams in the conference standings.

Winners 

The following is a list of MAC Tournament winners:

Key

Finals

Performance by school

Italics indicate a school that was not a conference member in the MAC's final men's soccer season

† No longer sponsor men's soccer

References

External links 
 Mid-American Conference Men's Soccer Record Book